A Little Game may refer to:
 A Little Game (1971 film)
 A Little Game (2014 film)